The Edinburgh Photographic Society is a photographic society based in Edinburgh, Scotland. It was established in 1861. The society awards medals annually to photographers of excellence.

It began in a small back room at 81 South Bridge in rivalry to the more formal Photographic Society of Scotland. In the first year the regular meetings were held at the Queen Street Hall (6 Queen Street) before moving to the National Bible Society Halls at 5 St Andrew Square. Not until 1892 did they acquire their own premises; 38 North Castle Street.

Notable Members
James David Marwick the first President of the Society
J. Traill Taylor, later the editor of the British Journal of Photography
John Ramsay L'Amy FRSE
James Valentine
George Henry Slight
David Drummond

Honorary members included Fox Talbot, Sir David Brewster, Lyon Playfair, Piazzi Smyth and George Shadbolt.

References

External links
Official site
Site dealing with the society's history

Photography organizations established in the 19th century
Scottish photography organisations
Organisations based in Edinburgh
Clubs and societies in Edinburgh
Organizations established in 1861
1861 establishments in Scotland
Arts organizations established in the 1860s